Shaikha Dheya bint Ebrahim Al Khalifa  Her Highness is a Member of the Royal Family of the Kingdom of Bahrain

Shaikha Dheya is the President of the Riyada Group of Companies which includes, Riyada Investment (President), Riyada Development (President),Sun Capital Investment where she currently resides as a member of the Board. She is the founder and partner of more than twenty Joint Ventures across the MENA region and Europe.

References

Reliance Money and Riyada Consulting launches new company in Saudi Arabia, to raise Riyal 200 million
Bharti Telesoft and Riyada Consulting form partnership with Arab Financial Services
 Akhbar AlKhaleej: Bahraini women on Forbes most powerful list

Living people
1973 births